Kulik may refer to:

Places
 Kulik, Lublin Voivodeship (east Poland)
 Kulik, Warmian-Masurian Voivodeship (north Poland)
 Kulik (crater), a lunar impact crater on the far side of the Moon

Other uses
 Kulik (surname)

See also 
 Kulak